Omar Arroyo Rodríguez (born 22 November 1956 in San Ramón, Costa Rica) is a retired Costa Rican professional footballer. He played for several clubs in Costa Rica.

Club career
At the club level, Arroyo played for Ramonense, Alajuelense and San Carlos. He won the Primera División de Costa Rica with Alajuelense during the 1982–83 and 1983-84 seasons. He scored a total of 94 goals in 378 league games. On 3 June 1984, he scored one of the fastest goals in the league's history, netting after 15 seconds for Alajuelense against San Carlos.

International career
Arroyo made 15 appearances for the full Costa Rica national football team from 1980 to 1985. He also played at the 1980 Olympic Games.

Managerial career
After retiring in 1989 due to a persistent knee injury, he worked for the Bank of Costa Rica until 1996. He returned in a role as manager of second division side Municipal Naranjo in 2002.

References

1956 births
Living people
People from San Ramón, Costa Rica
Association football forwards
Costa Rican footballers
Costa Rica international footballers
Olympic footballers of Costa Rica
Footballers at the 1980 Summer Olympics
A.D. Ramonense players
L.D. Alajuelense footballers
A.D. San Carlos footballers
Liga FPD players